The Standard Atlas is a light van which was produced and sold under various names between 1958 and 1980, initially in Britain and Europe, and subsequently in India.

Standard Atlas, Standard Atlas Major and Standard 15/20 (1958–1968) 
In 1958 Standard presented the Atlas, their contender in the growing but (in Britain) increasingly crowded small van sector.   It was a competitor for BMCs venerable J-Type and the much more modern Morris J2, as well as for the Ford Thames 400E, Commer FC and the market leading Bedford CA.   For some export markets, notably Canada and the U.S. the Standard Atlas was badged as a Triumph, reflecting the value of the brand recognition achieved for the Triumph by their sedans and sports models.

Light vans in Britain were at this time frequently identified by their maximum permissible gross payload, and the Atlas was often advertised simply as the Atlas 10 cwt or the Atlas 12 cwt, reflecting allowable load weights (including a driver) of 500 kg and 600 kg.  In addition to the panel van, a pick up truck version was offered. Both hinged doors and sliding doors were offered as was a middle side door.   There was also a small flatbed truck version which had rear hinged doors.

Like its competitors, the Atlas shared its engine with a passenger car from its manufacturer's range. In this case the engine in question was firstly the  petrol engine from the Standard Ten, which was installed under a cowling between the driver and passenger, and delivered power to the rear wheels, although certain parts came from the Standard Vanguard Utility. In this form the van was very slow. That was addressed in 1961 when it became possible to specify the van with a  petrol. The larger dimensions of this engine meant that the chassis had to be enlarged and the cabin design rearranged.

When the Standard Company was merged into Leyland Motors in 1964/5 the Atlas vans were then badged as Leyland 15 and Leyland 20, and were now provided with the Standard  petrol engine that also powered the Triumph TR4. Payload limits had also been raised to 15 cwt (750 kg gross) and 20 cwt (1000 kg gross). It was now also possible to order the van with a diesel engine. The unit in question was a  60 hp (44 kW) unit from Massey Ferguson who also installed it in tractors.

Leyland 15/20 1962–1968 
In 1963 Standard was acquired by Leyland Motors Limited and for 1964, the van was renamed Leyland 15 / Leyland 20 (according to capacity).

In 1968, Leyland merged with the British Motor Corporation to form the British Leyland Motor Corporation, and the van was taken out of production in order to avoid direct competition with a range of vans such as the Morris JU 250, now produced by the same company.

Standard 15/20 in India 1970–1980 
After production  of the van in the United Kingdom had ended, the tooling and panel presses were exported to southern India where the van re-emerged, to be produced, between 1970 and 1980 by Standard Motors of Chennai.

References

Sources
 

Atlas
Vans
Vehicles introduced in 1958
Rear-wheel-drive vehicles